Lachlan Hunter (born 13 December 1994) is a professional Australian rules footballer who plays for the Melbourne Football Club in the Australian Football League (AFL), having previously played for the . Hunter plays predominantly as an outside midfielder or wingman, but can also play as a half-forward. He played top-level junior football with the Western Jets in the TAC Cup, as well as with the Vic Metro representative team in the 2012 AFL Under 18 Championships.

Hunter was drafted with the 49th selection in the 2012 AFL draft, and made his debut for the  the following year. He is a Bulldogs premiership player, a former vice-captain, a Charles Sutton Medallist and Gary Dempsey Medallist, a winner of the Rose–Sutton Medal and a member of the 2016 22under22 team. He has placed in the top 10 of the Bulldogs best and fairest voting for five consecutive years.

Early life
Hunter was born to former Western Bulldogs player Mark Hunter and former professional Lacrosse player Colleen Hunter (née McVeigh). Hunter played junior football for the Williamstown Juniors from the Under 9 divisions all the way until he finished the under 16 divisions. Hunter completed his schooling at St Kevin's College, where he played for the school team alongside future teammates Tom Liberatore and Mitch Wallis. He also played with the Western Jets in the TAC Cup program. He had signs of becoming a prominent player early on, kicking 3 goals and having 37 disposals in a game against the Eastern Ranges Football Club. Hunter also featured in the Under 18 Vic Metro team in the 2012 AFL Under 18 Championships, playing four out of five games and picking up an influential 23 disposals in the team's 96-point demolition of Tasmania in the 2nd round of the championships.

AFL career

2013-2015: Early career
In his debut year, Hunter played predominantly as a half-forward, usually named on the interchange. Hunter made his debut in Round 13, 2013, against  at Etihad Stadium. Before his debut, then Bulldogs coach Brendan McCartney stated "He’s very creative, he just understands the game and when the ball is near him, good things happen – so we are looking forward to him debuting and going from there." In his debut game, Hunter collected 19 disposals, 5 marks, 2 behinds and kicked one goal with just his second kick in his AFL career. Hunter received a Mark of the Year nomination in the 21st round of the season after he took a Spectacular mark over fellow teammate Tom Campbell and  player Ben Rutten. He finished the season with a disposal efficiency of 75.6% and an average of 13.2 disposals and 2.9 inside 50s per game. Hunter signed a contract extension that kept him at the club until 2016 in December 2013.

Hunter had another consistent season in 2014, playing 14 games. Hunter finished the season averaging 14 disposals a game, with coach Brendan McCartney stating "He has displayed a range of admirable qualities in his short time at the Club and although Lachie’s best footy is still to come, we are pleased with the way he is tracking." Hunter was given the Number 7 guernsey, swapping his previous number, 26.

After a shaky start to the 2015 season, Hunter rapidly improved to secure a spot in the ' finals team. Hunter received a club-imposed ban for being late to club training, resulting in him missing many of the opening rounds of the season. Hunter was moved to the wing towards the late end of the season and he quickly became central to the team's efforts, averaging 30 disposals from Round 17 to Round 23 when he made the move to the wing. In that game he was also named as best on ground, as he broke his career record for most disposals by 8, reaching a new record of 32. He also collected 1 goal, 10 marks and 10 scoring involvements, as well as 516 metres gained. He collected 36 disposals, again breaking his career record for most disposals, and also kicked a behind, laid 4 tackles and took 6 marks. He was named as one of the Bulldogs' best on ground.

2016-2019: Breakout
Hunter enjoyed a breakthrough season in 2016, cementing his place in the Bulldogs' senior team and enhancing a reputation as one of the league's most prolific wingmen. He played every game for the Bulldogs and at one stage in the season was considered in the running to make the All-Australian team. Hunter also took 6 marks and made 4 clearances. An illegal tackle from  player Lindsay Thomas saw Hunter go to hospital after the game with concussion-like symptoms, but he recovered in time for the next round. He also had good games in rounds 2 and 11, where he collected 35 and 38 disposals, and kicked a goal in both games. Hunter collected 85 disposals over the course of the 2016 AFL finals series, averaging around 21 disposals a game. He played in the ' 62 year premiership drought-breaking team, collecting 19 disposals, 1 behind, 4 tackles and 1 mark. He finished the season as the club's leading disposal getter with 719 in total, averaging nearly 28 disposals per game, ranking him sixth overall in the AFL. He was ranked as the number one uncontested ball winner in the AFL, ending the year with 514 uncontested possessions. Hunter also came second at the club for inside 50s and equal third for goal assists. Hunter was recognized for his achievement when he finished third in the club's best and fairest count, winning the Gary Dempsey Medal. He also received 13 Brownlow votes.

Hunter played every game in the 2017 season, proving himself as one of the ' key players. Hunter signed a new contract in April which kept him at the Bulldogs until the end of 2019. He had a similarly good game in the ' 14-point win against  in round 1 of the season, where he kicked 3 goals, collected 21 disposals, and took 6 marks and 2 tackles. He was named as one of the ' best on ground. Hunter finished the season in 6th place in the Charles Sutton Medal count, gathering 125 votes, 60 votes behind first-placed Marcus Bontempelli. In November of that year, Hunter was elevated to the leadership group of the Bulldogs, alongside Jordan Roughead, Jack Redpath and Jason Johannisen.

The 2018 AFL season saw Hunter have one of his best seasons yet, obtaining the club's best and fairest award. Hunter, alongside Jack Macrae and Jason Johannisen, was named as best on ground for the Bulldogs, after gathering 34 disposals, 9 marks and 3 tackles. He collected 28 disposals, took 5 marks and laid 4 tackles, named as one of the team's best on ground in the big loss. Hunter was rewarded with the Charles Sutton Medal at the end of the season. He collected 191 votes, just 1 vote ahead of second-placed Jack Macrae. Hunter led the club in marks and disposals for the total season, getting 117 and 626 respectively.

Hunter signed a major 5-year contract extension on 12 March 2019, tying him to the club until 2024. Hunter also bolstered the Bulldogs' effort against  in Round 6 of the season, collecting 32 disposals, 8 marks and a goal. He was named as the Bulldogs' best on ground. Hunter finished in 6th place in the Charles Sutton Medal count, 138 votes behind first-placed Marcus Bontempelli. This made it his fourth consecutive year in a row getting named in the Top 10 of the best and fairest voting. In December 2019, Hunter was appointed the vice-captain of the Western Bulldogs, after previous vice-captain Marcus Bontempelli stepped up to the role of captaincy.

2020-2022: Struggles and injury, trade to Melbourne
The 2020 AFL season was a chaotic one for Hunter, with drink-driving offences and personal issues pushing him out of the team, reducing him to a total of just 10 games played in the COVID-19 affected season. In April 2020, after a drunk driving offence, he was suspended for four games and voluntarily relinquished the vice captaincy. He was also fined $5000 for drink driving and given suspended fines for offences involving breaching of social distancing. Hunter came back into the team for Rounds 6 and 7, and averaged 26.5 disposals and 4 marks per game, but then took a break due to personal reasons, missing the next five rounds. Hunter had one of his best games for the season in his return to the team in Round 12, collecting 29 disposals, a goal and 6 marks in a game where he ruled out rumours of a trade, after grabbing his Bulldogs jumper in celebration at kicking a goal. Hunter was praised as one of the team's best players in the match. In this game, he collected 35 disposals, kicked 1 goal and 3 behinds, and took 7 marks. He was named the second best player for the Bulldogs, behind Tom Liberatore. Despite missing nearly half of the season, Hunter finished 9th in the Charles Sutton Medal voting at the conclusion of the season, with a total of 84 votes, 121 behind first-placed Caleb Daniel.

Hunter had a much different season in 2021 to his previous few, playing as a high half-forward due to the team's large amount of midfield depth. He had surgery on his hand in the wake of his injury.

Personal life
He is in a relationship with Maddison Sullivan-Thorpe, who he got engaged to in 2019.

Statistics
Updated to the end of the 2022 season.

|-
| 2013 ||  || 26
| 9 || 4 || 4 || 66 || 53 || 119 || 25 || 16 || 0.4 || 0.4 || 7.3 || 5.9 || 13.2 || 2.8 || 1.8 || 0
|-
| 2014 ||  || 26
| 14 || 9 || 13 || 126 || 72 || 198 || 51 || 37 || 0.6 || 0.9 || 9.0 || 5.1 || 14.1 || 3.6 || 2.6 || 0
|-
| 2015 ||  || 7
| 13 || 3 || 5 || 147 || 140 || 287 || 64 || 28 || 0.2 || 0.4 || 11.3 || 10.8 || 22.1 || 4.9 || 2.2 || 2
|-
| scope=row bgcolor=F0E68C | 2016# ||  || 7
| 26 || 10 || 14 || 391 || 328 || 719 || 146 || 66 || 0.4 || 0.5 || 15.0 || 12.6 || 27.7 || 5.6 || 2.5 || 13
|-
| 2017 ||  || 7
| 22 || 18 || 9 || 302 || 195 || 497 || 116 || 56 || 0.8 || 0.4 || 13.7 || 8.9 || 22.6 || 5.3 || 2.5 || 2
|-
| 2018 ||  || 7
| 22 || 8 || 10 || 343 || 283 || 626 || 117 || 58 || 0.6 || 0.8 || 15.8 || 12.0 || 27.8 || 7.0 || 2.0 || 9
|-
| 2019 ||  || 7
| 23 || 5 || 9 || 332 || 279 || 611 || 150 || 53 || 0.2 || 0.4 || 14.4 || 12.1 || 26.6 || 6.5 || 2.3 || 5
|-
| 2020 ||  || 7
| 10 || 4 || 8 || 137 || 116 || 253 || 54 || 24 || 0.4 || 0.8 || 13.7 || 11.6 || 25.3 || 5.4 || 2.4 || 6
|-
| 2021 ||  || 7
| 25 || 10 || 7 || 326 || 220 || 546 || 125 || 60 || 0.4 || 0.3 || 13.0 || 8.8 || 21.8 || 5.0 || 2.4 || 0
|-
| 2021 ||  || 7
| 10 || 2 || 5 || 118 || 77 || 195 || 54 || 26 || 0.2 || 0.5 || 11.8 || 7.7 || 19.5 || 5.4 || 2.6 || 0
|- class=sortbottom
! colspan=3 | Career
! 173 !! 73 !! 84 !! 2288 !! 1763 !! 4051 !! 902 !! 424 !! 0.4 !! 0.5 !! 13.2 !! 10.2 !! 23.4 !! 5.2 !! 2.5 !! 37
|}

Notes

Honours and achievements
Team
AFL premiership: 2016
Individual
22under22 team: 2016
Gary Dempsey Medal: 2016
Rose–Sutton Medal: 2015
Charles Sutton Medal: 2018

References

External links

1994 births
Australian rules footballers from Victoria (Australia)
Living people
Western Bulldogs players
Western Bulldogs Premiership players
Williamstown Football Club players
Western Jets players
Charles Sutton Medal winners
One-time VFL/AFL Premiership players